Navodaya Vidya Samasthe is a private English medium school, located in Kurboor village, India. The school was founded as an English medium School in Kurboor, Chintamani taluk, Chikballapur District in 1987. It has well over 1000 students, catering for children studying from Nursery to 10th Standard Level. There are 35 teachers. A teacher training institute was opened in 2005, called Nanjamma Teachers Training Institute.

See also
Kurboor

Schools in Chikkaballapur district
Private schools in Karnataka
Educational institutions established in 1987
1987 establishments in Karnataka